The Ball Chair was designed by Finnish furniture designer Eero Aarnio in 1963. The Ball Chair is also known as the globe chair and is famous for its unconventional shape. It is considered a classic of industrial design. More recent versions have increased the overall size and added features including music speakers and MP3 player integration.

History 
According to the chair's designer, Eero Aarnio:

In popular culture 
The ball chair has been used in films to evoke the futuristic style of the 1960s, or to suggest the villainy of a person who sits shadowed within its depths. Examples include:
 The Prisoner (1967)
 Moon Zero Two (1969)
 Tommy (1975)
 Dazed and Confused (1993)
 Mars Attacks! (1996)
 Men in Black (1997)
The ball chair also appear on the cover of the fourth volume of the manga Spy × Family, with Bond, the Pyrenean Mountain Dog owned by the main characters sitting on it.

For the cover of American singer Jennette McCurdy's self titled debut album, she is pictured in a pink ball chair.

See also 
 List of chairs
 Bubble Chair
 Ovalia Egg Chair

References

External links 
 Official Aarnio website
 Eero Aarnio Originals website
 When furniture takes the starring role: The Ball Chair by Eero Aarnio

Chairs
Finnish inventions
Individual models of furniture
Finnish design